Lieutenant-General Raoul Daufresne de la Chevalerie (17 March 1881 – 25 November 1967) was a Belgian sportsman and commander of the Free Belgian forces during the Second World War. He was born in Bruges and died in Uccle.

Sporting career
He was a football player for Cercle Brugge from 1903 until 1907. In his last 2 years at Cercle, he was also president of the team, succeeding Leon De Meester. His player career and presidency at Cercle Brugge ended abruptly when he moved to Cercle's rivals, Club Brugge to become a member of the board as well as a player for the blue and black side.

But football wasn't the only sport Raoul Daufresne de la Chevalerie was practising. He was also an equestrian and he played hockey and tennis. At the 1920 Summer Olympics in Antwerp, Daufresne de la Chevalerie was coach of the Belgian football team. He also represented Belgium as hockey player (winning the bronze medal) at these Olympics.

World War II
During the military mobilisation of Belgium in 1939, he was appointed to command the 17th Division. After the Germans occupied Belgium he was captured, but quickly released.

He fled from Belgium to Great Britain, where he was given command of the Free Belgian land forces with the rank of Lieutenant General. After the war ended he was briefly a military attaché to Czechoslovakia, and subsequently retired from the military.

References

Sources

External links
 
 Information about former presidents of Cercle Brugge 
 Cerclemuseum.be 

1881 births
1967 deaths
Belgian footballers
Association football forwards
Cercle Brugge K.S.V. players
Club Brugge KV players
Belgian male field hockey players
Belgian male tennis players
Olympic field hockey players of Belgium
Olympic tennis players of Belgium
Sportspeople from Bruges
Field hockey players at the 1920 Summer Olympics
Olympic bronze medalists for Belgium
Belgian football managers
Belgian Army personnel of World War I
Belgian football chairmen and investors
Belgian Pro League players
Olympic medalists in field hockey
Belgian Army generals of World War II
Belgian people in the United Kingdom during World War II
Medalists at the 1920 Summer Olympics
Footballers from Bruges